The 2021–22 Luxembourg Cup was the 97th year of the football knockout tournament in Luxembourg. The cup began on 8 September 2021. The winner of the cup has earned a place in the 2022–23 UEFA Europa Conference League.

The previous season's cup was abandoned due to the COVID-19 pandemic in Luxembourg.

Preliminary round
Seven preliminary round matches were played on 8 September 2021.

|}

First round
Thirty-two first round matches were played on 11 and 12 September 2021.

|}

Second round
Thirty-two second round matches were played on 12 and 13 October 2021.

|}

Third round
Sixteen third round matches were played on 30 and 31 October 2021.

|}

Fourth round
Eight fourth round matches were played on 6 April 2022.

|}

Quarter-final
Four quarter-final matches were played on 20 April 2022.

|}

Semi-final
Two semi-final matches were played on 11 May 2022.

|}

Final

References

Cup
2021-22
Luxembourg